Paul Maloney may refer to:

 Paul Lewis Maloney (born 1949), United States federal judge
 Paul H. Maloney (1876–1967), U.S. Representative from Louisiana
 Paul Maloney (footballer) (born 1952), English professional footballer